Georges Baconnet (1892–1961) was a French stage and film actor. He was a member of the Comédie-Française from 1946 to his death.

Selected filmography
 The Last Judgment (1945)
 La carcasse et le tord-cou (1958)
 We Will All Go to Paris (1950)
 The Prize (1950)
 Le rosier de Madame Husson (1950)
Two Pennies Worth of Violets (1951)
 Alone in Paris (1951)
 Monsieur Leguignon, Signalman (1952)
 Le Plaisir (1952)
 Their Last Night (1953)
 Madelon (1955)
 Les Duraton (1955)
 La joyeuse prison (1956)
 Sénéchal le magnifique (1957)
 The Marriage of Figaro (1959)

References

Bibliography
 Milena Gabanelli &  Alessandra Mattirolo. Brigitte Bardot. Gremese Editore, 1983.

External links

1892 births
1961 deaths
French male film actors
French male stage actors
People from Saône-et-Loire